Twelve Variations on "Ah vous dirai-je, Maman", K. 265/300e, is a piano composition by Wolfgang Amadeus Mozart, composed when he was around 25 years old (1781 or 1782). This piece consists of twelve variations on the French folk song "Ah! vous dirai-je, maman". The French melody first appeared in 1761, and has been used for many children's songs, such as "Twinkle, Twinkle, Little Star", "Baa, Baa, Black Sheep", and the "Alphabet Song".

Music

This work was composed for solo piano and consists of the theme (transcribed below) and 12 variations. Only the final two variations have tempo indications, Adagio and Allegro respectively.

Composition date
For a time, it was thought that these variations were composed in 1778, while Mozart stayed in Paris from April to September in that year, the assumption being that the melody of a French song could only have been picked up by Mozart while residing in France. For this presumed composition date, the composition was renumbered from K. 265 to K. 300e in the chronological catalogue of Mozart's compositions. Later analysis of Mozart's manuscript of the composition by Wolfgang Plath rather indicated 1781/1782 as the probable composition date.

The variations were first published in Vienna in 1785.

References

External links
 
 
 

Compositions by Wolfgang Amadeus Mozart
Ah vous dirais-je, Maman
1781 compositions
Compositions in C major
Compositions using folk songs